The Pig's Law is a Canadian crime comedy-drama film, directed by Érik Canuel and released in 2001. The film stars Isabel Richer and Catherine Trudeau as Stéphane and Bettie Brousseau, two sisters running a struggling pig farm in rural Quebec; they have rented part of their land out to a criminal marijuana smuggling ring led by Paquette (Sylvain Marcel), but run afoul of the smugglers when Stéphane sells part of the crop herself without their knowledge to pay off her mortgage debt before the farm is foreclosed.

The film's cast also includes Christian Bégin, Jean-Nicolas Verreault, Stéphane Demers, Christopher Heyerdahl and Marie Brassard.

Richer received a Prix Jutra nomination for Best Actress at the 4th Jutra Awards.

References

External links
 

2001 films
Canadian crime comedy-drama films
2000s thriller films
Canadian thriller films
Films shot in Quebec
Films set in Quebec
Films directed by Érik Canuel
Canadian films about cannabis
2000s crime comedy-drama films
2000s French-language films
French-language Canadian films
2000s Canadian films
2001 directorial debut films